Troy Bourke (born March 30, 1994) is a Canadian professional ice hockey center who is currently playing for  EC Red Bull Salzburg of the ICE Hockey League (ICEHL). He was selected 72nd overall, by the Colorado Avalanche, in the 2012 NHL Entry Draft.

Playing career
Bourke was raised in Onoway, Alberta, and was first selected by the Prince George Cougars 26th overall in the 2009 Western Hockey League bantam draft after a bantam career with the PAC Timberwolves in the AMBHL. In the 2009–10 season, he first played midget hockey in the Alberta Midget Hockey League with the St. Albert Raiders and was selected as the AMHL top player before joining the Cougars at the completion of his midget season to begin his major junior hockey career.

With increasing his production in each of his first two full WHL seasons, Bourke as a then diminutive sized forward was selected 72nd overall in the 2012 NHL Entry Draft by the Colorado Avalanche. As the Cougars Captain in his final junior season, Bourke led the team with 56 assists and finished second with 85 points, however was unable to help Prince George qualify for the playoffs in the 2013–14 season. Bourke was then signed to an amateur try-out contract with the Avalanche's AHL affiliate, the Lake Erie Monsters on March 19, 2014. Two days later, Bourke made an impact in his professional debut  in scoring a goal and two assists, in a 5-0 victory over the Rochester Americans. With the Monsters also out of playoff contention, Bourke finished the season with 7 points in 15 games.

On May 29, 2014, Bourke was signed to a three-year entry level contract with the Avalanche. Upon attending Colorado's NHL training camp, Bourke was reassigned to Lake Erie to begin his first full professional season in 2014–15.

On June 26, 2017, Bourke as a restricted free agent, was not tendered a qualifying contract by the Colorado Avalanche, thus ending his three-year tenure within the organization in releasing him to free agency. With no NHL contract offers over the summer, Bourke signed a one-year AHL contract with the Syracuse Crunch on September 26, 2017.

Bourke remained within the Crunch organization for two seasons, splitting the 2018–19 season, between the AHL and ECHL with affiliate, the Orlando Solar Bears.

As a free agent with his career prospects stalling, Bourke opted to pursue a European career, agreeing to a one-year contract with German club, Schwenninger Wild Wings of the Deutsche Eishockey Liga (DEL), on May 16, 2019.

Following two productive seasons in the DEL, Bourke left Germany as a free agent and was signed to a one-year contract with Finnish club, Oulun Kärpät of the Liiga, on May 28, 2021. Bourke enjoyed a successful season with Kärpät in the 2021–22 season, placing second in team scoring with 12 goals and 24 assists for 36 points in 53 regular season games.

On June 3, 2022, Bourke left Finland as a free agent and continued his European career by signing a one-year contract with Austrian based, EC Red Bull Salzburg of the ICEHL.

Career statistics

Regular season and playoffs

International

Awards and honours

References

External links

1994 births
Living people
Adirondack Thunder players
Canadian ice hockey centres
Colorado Avalanche draft picks
Fort Wayne Komets players
Lake Erie Monsters players
Orlando Solar Bears (ECHL) players
Oulun Kärpät players
Prince George Cougars players
EC Red Bull Salzburg players
San Antonio Rampage players
Schwenninger Wild Wings players
Ice hockey people from Edmonton
Syracuse Crunch players